Emma Tiger Schweiger (born 26 October 2002) is a German-American actress. She is known for playing the role of Cheyenne Blue in the 2007 film Keinohrhasen and its 2009 sequel Zweiohrküken and the role of Magdalena in Kokowääh and its 2013 sequel Kokowääh 2, all directed by her father Til Schweiger.

Family 
Emma Tiger Schweiger was born on 26 October 2002 in Los Angeles, California, to German actor Til Schweiger and American fashion model Dana Schweiger (born Carlson). She is the youngest of four children, after Valentin (born 1995), Luna (born 1997) and Lilli (born 1998). All four are child actors, having first appeared in the 2007 film Keinohrhasen and its 2009 sequel Zweiohrküken, directed by their father. Her parents separated in 2005. Schweiger now lives with her mother in Malibu, California.

Career 
Schweiger made her film debut as Cheyenne Blue in Keinohrhasen (2007), co–starring Nora Tschirner and her father Til Schweiger, who also directed the film. In 2009, she reprised her role in the Keinohrhasen sequel, Zweiohrküken. In 2011, Schweiger starred along with her father in his new film Kokowääh and has since reprised her role in the sequel Kokowääh 2. After that, she played Conni in Conni & Co.

Filmography

References

External links 
 

2002 births
German child actresses
German film actresses
German people of American descent
American people of German descent
Living people
Actresses from Berlin
Actresses from Los Angeles
21st-century German actresses